Conemaugh may refer to the following locations in Pennsylvania:

Conemaugh Township, Cambria County, Pennsylvania
East Conemaugh, Pennsylvania, a borough within the township
Conemaugh Township, Indiana County, Pennsylvania
Conemaugh Township, Somerset County, Pennsylvania
Conemaugh River, a tributary of the Kiskiminetas River
Little Conemaugh River, a tributary of the Conemaugh River
Lake Conemaugh

See also